East Rockaway Junior-Senior High School (often abbreviated ERHS) is a co-educational six-year secondary school in East Rockaway, New York, and the sole high school in Nassau County, New York, School District 41 (East Rockaway School District), the smallest school district in Nassau County. It is currently undergoing renovations to expand the school into a middle school and high school, becoming a seven-year secondary school. East Rockaway High School serves graduates from local Centre Ave. and Rhame Ave. Elementary Schools, as well as the private St. Raymond Elementary School.

As of the 2014-15 school year, the school had an enrollment of 554 students and 55.3 classroom teachers (on an FTE basis), for a student–teacher ratio of 10.0:1. There were 100 students (18.1% of enrollment) eligible for free lunch and 34 (6.1% of students) eligible for reduced-cost lunch.

Athletics
East Rockaway High School's athletic teams are known as the "Rocks" (and the "Lady Rocks") and have Division IV teams in American football, baseball, volleyball, softball, basketball, and track and field. The school's soccer and lacrosse teams are shared between itself and Malverne Senior High School. The school's mascot, The Rockman, is visually based on The Thing of the Fantastic Four. The school's colors are orange and black. Although the school's size is among the smallest on Long Island, they are also among the most competitive teams. They are especially strong in Varsity and Junior Varsity basketball, softball, and volleyball, and middle school baseball and volleyball.

Musicals
Every year, the students of ERHS, often inviting elementary students, stage a musical production.  These productions include You're a Good Man, Charlie Brown (1989), Little Shop of Horrors (1990 and 2014), The Wizard of Oz (1991, 2010, and 2020), Peter Pan (1992 and 2002), Annie (1993 and 2004), Godspell (1994), The Sound of Music (1995 and 2011), Cinderella (1996), Bye Bye Birdie (1997 and 2019), Oliver! (1998 and 2009), Guys and Dolls (1999), The Music Man (2000), Mame (2001), Grease (2003), Hello, Dolly! (2005), Damn Yankees (2006), West Side Story (2007), City of Angels (2008),  Crazy for You (2012), Seussical (2013), Willy Wonka and the Chocolate Factory (2015), Mary Poppins (2016),  Shrek the Musical  (2017), and The Little Mermaid (2018).

Notable alumni
 Brian Keith, actor
 Don Murray, actor

References

External links
 
 East Rockaway High School Alumni Association website

Public high schools in New York (state)
Schools in Nassau County, New York
Public middle schools in New York (state)